The Nissan Diesel Space Runner RA (kana:日産ディーゼル・スペースランナーRA) was a heavy-duty single-decker bus produced by the Japanese manufacturer Nissan Diesel from 2005 until 2010. It can be either built as a complete bus or a bus chassis.

The styling is completely different from the Nissan Diesel UA, that it has a rounded roof dome (more rounded than the UA) and a separately mounted destination sign. The Space Runner RA engine using AdBlue Selective Catalytic Reduction technology.

Models 
ADG-RA273 (2005)
PKG-RA274/PDG-RA273 (2006)

References 

Bus chassis
Buses of Japan
Full-size buses
Low-floor buses
Step-entrance buses
Space Runner RA
UD trucks
Vehicles introduced in 2005